The History Museum at the Castle is a local history museum located in downtown Appleton, Wisconsin across College Avenue from Lawrence University.  Owned and operated by the Outagamie County Historical Society (OCHS), the museum has previously operated under the names The Outagamie Museum and The Houdini Historic Center.  The building was earlier known as Masonic Temple. In 2018 the museum was a recipient of the 2018 National Medal for Museum and Library Service, the highest honor given to a museum or library in the United States.

History
The building in which the museum is housed was formerly a Masonic temple, built in 1923, and is listed on the National Register of Historic Places as "Masonic Temple". Appleton's Waverly Masonic Lodge sold the building to the OCHS in 1985.

The museum's collections focus on the history of the Fox River Valley, containing artifacts from the 1840s onward. The History Museum at the Castle also has a large collection of original Harry Houdini personal documents and performance paraphernalia, including a selection of his picks, locks, keys, and handcuffs. The museum also holds a collection of artifacts from the life of Senator Joe McCarthy, who was from the Appleton area.  The museum owns 35,000 photographs dating back as far as 1857, including ones of Houdini, McCarthy, and Edna Ferber.

Other Houdini museums
American Museum of Magic
David Copperfield's International Museum and Library of the Conjuring Arts, which is closed to the public
Houdini Museum (Scranton, Pennsylvania)
The House of Houdini
Harry Ransom Center at the University of Texas at Austin houses Houdini ephemera and a large collection of Houdini letters and manuscripts.
Houdini Museum of New York

See also
List of magic museums

References

External links
The History Museum at the Castle
Waverly Masonic Lodge

Magic museums
Masonic buildings completed in 1923
Buildings and structures in Appleton, Wisconsin
Biographical museums in Wisconsin
History museums in Wisconsin
Former Masonic buildings in Wisconsin
Museums in Outagamie County, Wisconsin
Clubhouses on the National Register of Historic Places in Wisconsin
Tudor Revival architecture in Wisconsin
National Register of Historic Places in Outagamie County, Wisconsin